Claudio Lotito (born 9 May 1957 in Rome) is an Italian entrepreneur and politician. He is the owner and president of the Serie A  football club S.S. Lazio since 2004.

Lotito earned his high school diploma in Classics at Ugo Foscolo Classical Lyceum in Albano Laziale and a Bachelor of Arts in pedagogy cum laude from University of Rome I "La Sapienza".

Lotito was banned from football for two and a half years in July 2006 for his part in the 2006 Italian football scandal. Lotito got banned again for 10 months due to third parties ownership of Mauro Zárate and Julio Ricardo Cruz. However it was shortened to 2 months after appeal. He is second on the electoral list for the Senate in the Caserta-Avellino-Benevento district, close to Naples, for the coalition around Silvio Berlusconi In March 2021, he was banned from football for seven months due to Lazio breaching COVID-19 protocols.

References

1957 births
Living people
Businesspeople from Rome
Forza Italia (2013) politicians
Italian football chairmen and investors
People involved in the 2006 Italian football scandal
20th-century Italian businesspeople
21st-century Italian businesspeople